Douglas Wood may refer to:

Douglas Wood (writer), US actor, writer, producer of television shows and animated movies
Douglas Wood (naturalist) (f. 1990-2000s), US author and musician.
Douglas Wood (engineer) (born 1941), engineer taken hostage in Iraq in 2005
Douglas Wood (actor) (1880-1966), US film actor, see Little Old New York
Doug Wood (pole vaulter) (born 1966), Canadian athlete in pole-vault
Dougie Wood (born 1940), Scottish athlete and coach in football

See also
Buster Bloodvessel (born 1958), born Douglas Woods, English singer